Eugen Jebeleanu (24 April 1911 – 21 August 1991) was a Romanian poet, translator, journalist and scholar.

Biography
He was born in Câmpina, where he attended elementary school. After graduating from high school in Braşov at age 11 in 1922, he published his first poems five years later in the literary review Viaţa literară. His first book of poetry, Schituri cu soare ("Sketes with Sun"), appeared in 1929, the year he moved to Bucharest to study law at the University of Bucharest. He published another volume of poems, Inimi sub săbii ("Hearts under Swords") in 1934, but Jebeleanu's principal literary activity in the 1930s was as a journalist closely allied with the left-wing press.

After World War II, he solidly supported the new Communist leadership and ardently promoted socialist realism. Most of his postwar poetry deals with the struggle against fascism, the Romanian revolutionary tradition going back to 1848, and championing the new regime's ideology. Despite his political engagement, his poetry rose above the level of a verse pamphleteer. His postwar volumes of poetry include Ceea ce nu se uită ("What Cannot Be Forgotten", 1945); Scutul păcii ("The Shield of Peace", 1949); Poeme de pace şi de luptă ("Poems of Peace and War", 1950); În satul lui Sahia ("In Sahia's Village", 1952); Bălcescu (1952), a long poem written in honour of the historian and revolutionary Nicolae Bălcescu; and Cîntecele pădurii tinere ("Songs of the Young Forest", 1953).

Jebeleanu first achieved international recognition with his collection of humanitarian poems about the atomic bombing of Hiroshima: Surîsul Hiroşimei ("The Smile of Hiroshima", 1958). After an "oratorio" celebrating the liberation at the end of the war, Oratoriul eliberării ("The Oratorio of Liberation", 1959), and a volume of selected verse, Poezii şi poeme ("Poems", 1961), he published one of his most highly regarded collections of poems, Lidice, Cîntece împotriva morţii ("Lidice, Songs against Death", 1963). In the same spirit of universal humanism as Surîsul Hiroşimei, his new collection was inspired by a postwar visit to the site of the Czech village of Lidice, which together with its inhabitants was totally destroyed by the Nazis during World War II as an act of revenge.

Jebeleanu's other publications include Din veacul XX ("From the Twentieth Century", 1956), a collection of journalistic texts; Poeme, 1944-1964 ("Poems, 1944-1964", 1964); Elegie pentru floarea secerată ("Elegy for the Cut Flower", 1966), one of his important collections of lyrics and a break from his previous engaged poetry; Hanibal ("Hannibal", 1972), a volume of poems; and Deasupra zilei ("Above the Day", 1981), a book of "jottings" on various subjects. In the 1970s, the Romanian Academy, of which he was a member, nominated him for the Nobel Prize in Literature.

Although initially a supporter of the regime, he expressed alarm after the July Theses were issued in 1971, and, considered one of the leaders of the liberal wing of the Writers' Union of Romania, was dropped from the Romanian Communist Party's central committee at its 13th Congress in 1984.

Jebeleanu translated poetry from six languages, including Hungarian (Petőfi), Turkish, French (Hugo) and German (Rilke).  Three poems of his appeared in English in a 1969 anthology, and five more in 1985. In 2007, his last collection of poems, Armă secretă ("Secret Weapon", 1980), appeared in English, the first full volume of his work to do so. His son Tudor is a graphic artist. He and his wife Florica (née Cordescu), a painter who died in 1965, also had a daughter, Florica.

One of his hobbies was recreational fishing.

Notes

External links
 Selected poems from Slope
 Selected poems at "Poezii"

1911 births
1991 deaths
People from Câmpina
Titular members of the Romanian Academy
Romanian male poets
20th-century Romanian poets
Romanian translators
20th-century translators
Romanian journalists
Romanian communists
Romanian-language poets
Herder Prize recipients
20th-century journalists